Whittington Health NHS Trust is an NHS trust in London, England, that manages the Whittington Hospital. It primarily serves the London boroughs of Islington and Haringey, but also provides some services to the London boroughs of Barnet, Camden, Enfield and Hackney. It runs the Michael Palin Centre for Stammering Children.

History 
The trust was established as Whittington Hospital NHS Trust on 4 November 1992, and became operational on 1 April 1993. It took its current name on 6 November 2017.

See also 
 Healthcare in London
 List of NHS trusts

References

External links 
 
 Whittington Health NHS Trust on the NHS website
 Inspection reports from the Care Quality Commission

NHS trusts